Evan Giarrusso, better known as EVAN GIIA is a Brooklyn-based vocalist. Her first notable song was "Heat of The Moment" with music duo MEMBA, which was selected as the singles of the week by BBC Radio 1 in 2016. In September 2022, GIIA's Don't Let Me Let Go ( with Dillion Francis and Illenium) secured the number one position on US Dance Radio.

Career
EVAN GIIA was brought up in Hingham and is an alumna of Berklee College of Music and has undergone training of opera singing. Her first single was "Heat of the Moment" in 2016. Her second single, "Brave" was listed by as the top single by Hype Machine in 2017. In 2018, she dropped "Westworld", one of her most popular songs. In 2019, GIIA partnered with New York based duo MEMBA in their EP Saga-II, where she was the vocalist of the song "Walls Down". In November of the same year, her single "Sidelines" was released. In February 2020, she dropped the single "Switch Off". In April 2020, her single "Focus" was released for which she also was the songwriter. In October 2020, GIIA teamed with Gorgon City in their single "Burning", which was premiered by Billboard Dance. The song reached Billboard Dance Chart's position 7 and was two weeks in the peak. In the same month, she also launched her solo, "tiny life". In the end of 2020, she attended numerous concerts with music duo Odesza. During early 2021, she did a US tour with MEMBA. GIIA appeared in different music festivals like Elements Music Festival, Breakaway Music Festival etc.

Discography

Extended Plays

Singles

As a lead artist

As featured artist

References 

American women pop singers
American women singers
American sopranos
Year of birth missing (living people)
Living people
21st-century American women